Melba Highway connects the outer eastern suburb of Coldstream, near Lilydale, and the town of Yea, in Victoria's Upper Goulburn on the Goulburn Valley Highway. The road is named after Dame Nellie Melba, a famed Australian opera singer of the early 20th century, whose former country estate lies at the southern end of the highway, at the junction of the Melba and Maroondah highways in Coldstream.

Route
Melba Highway starts at the intersection of High Street (Goulburn Valley Highway) and Station Street in Yea and heads south as a dual-lane, single-carriageway road, passing through forest and open agricultural land, descending down a steep grade between Glenburn and Dixons Creek to the bottom of the Great Dividing Range, through a road junction that links the highway with the nearby towns of Kinglake and Toolangi, a former home of Australian author C. J. Dennis. It continues south and then west along the bypass around Yarra Glen, then continues south, passing through the alluvial plains of the Yarra River and the rich Yarra Valley vineyards, before eventually ending at the intersection with Maroondah Highway in Coldstream.

Speed Limits
Coldstream – Yarra Glen 80 km/h
Yarra Glen 50 km/h
Yarra Glen – Glenburn via Yarra Glen Bypass 100 km/h
Glenburn 80 km/h
Glenburn – Yea 100 km/h
Yea 60 km/h

History
The passing of the Country Roads Act of 1958 (itself an evolution from the original Highways and Vehicles Act of 1924) provided for the declaration of State Highways, roads two-thirds financed by the State government through the Country Roads Board (later VicRoads). The road was declared a State Highway in June 1983; before this declaration, the roads were referred to as Yarra Glen-Yea Road and Yarra Glen Road.

Melba Highway was signed as State Route 153 between Yea and Coldstream in 1986; with Victoria's conversion to the newer alphanumeric system in the late 1990s this was replaced with route B300.

The passing of the Road Management Act 2004 granted the responsibility of overall management and development of Victoria's major arterial roads to VicRoads: in 2004, VicRoads re-declared Melba Highway (Arterial #6300) between Yea and Coldstream.

The Yarra Glen bypass which opened in May 2010 diverts trucks and other through vehicles. Works also saw the Bell Street/Melba Highway roundabout created along with a new level crossing through the roundabout for the Yarra Valley Railway.

Major Intersections and Towns

See also

 Highways in Australia
 Highways in Victoria

References

Highways in Victoria (Australia)